Kálmán Vaskó (23 November 1872 – 8 August 1932) was a Hungarian rowing coxswain. He competed at the 1908 Summer Olympics and the 1912 Summer Olympics.

References

External links
 

1872 births
1932 deaths
Hungarian male rowers
Olympic rowers of Hungary
Rowers at the 1908 Summer Olympics
Rowers at the 1912 Summer Olympics
People from Komárom
Coxswains (rowing)
Sportspeople from Komárom-Esztergom County